Matthew Bailey (born April 5, 1991) is a Canadian professional ice hockey player. He is currently playing with Södertälje SK in the HockeyAllsvenskan (Allsv).

Playing career
Bailey played for the Alaska Anchorage Seawolves in the NCAA Men's Division I Western Collegiate Hockey Association (WCHA). In his senior year, Bailey's outstanding play was rewarded with a selection to the 2013–14 All-WCHA First Team.

On March 26, 2014, the Anaheim Ducks of the National Hockey League (NHL) signed Bailey as an undrafted free agent to a two-year entry-level contract and on March 28, 2014, he made his professional debut with the Norfolk Admirals of the American Hockey League.

At the conclusion of his entry-level contract with the Ducks, Bailey was not tendered a qualifying offer in order to retain his rights on June 27, 2016. As a free agent, Bailey belatedly signed to a one-year AHL contract with the Stockton Heat, the primary affiliate to the Calgary Flames on September 6, 2016. In the 2016–17 season, Bailey split between the Flames' AHL and ECHL affiliates, appearing in 17 games for 7 points with the Heat before opting to sign his first contract abroad in agreeing to join Swedish second division club, Mora IK in their upcoming playoff quest on February 10, 2017.

After spending two full seasons in the Swedish Hockey League with Mora IK, Bailey left as a free agent following their return to the Allsvenskan at the conclusion of the 2018–19 season. On July 22, 2019, Bailey agreed to a one-year contract with German club, ERC Ingolstadt of the Deutsche Eishockey Liga (DEL). In the 2019–20 season, Bailey adapted quickly with ERC by registering 9 goals and 25 points through 48 regular season games. 

With the COVID-19 pandemic ending the DEL season before the playoffs, Bailey left the club as a free agent to return to the Swedish Allsvenskan by agreeing to a one-year contract with Södertälje SK on June 12, 2020.

Career statistics

Regular season and playoffs

International

Awards and honours

References

External links 

1991 births
Living people
Adirondack Thunder players
Alaska Anchorage Seawolves men's ice hockey players
Canadian ice hockey forwards
ERC Ingolstadt players
Ice hockey people from Manitoba
Mora IK players
Neepawa Natives players
Norfolk Admirals players
People from Oakbank, Manitoba
San Diego Gulls (AHL) players
Sioux Falls Stampede players
Stockton Heat players
Tri-City Storm players
Canadian expatriate ice hockey players in Sweden